Axel Kühn (born 22 June 1967 in Erfurt) is a German bobsledder who competed in the early 1990s. He won a silver medal in the four-man event at the 1992 Winter Olympics in Albertville.

Kühn also won a gold medal in the four-man event at the 1991 FIBT World Championships in Altenberg.

References
 Bobsleigh four-man Olympic medalists for 1924, 1932-56, and since 1964
 Bobsleigh four-man world championship medalists since 1930

Bobsledders at the 1992 Winter Olympics
German male bobsledders
Olympic bobsledders of Germany
Olympic silver medalists for Germany
Living people
1967 births
Sportspeople from Erfurt
Olympic medalists in bobsleigh
Medalists at the 1992 Winter Olympics